

Thiruvananthapuram district in Kerala, India has a variety of schools affiliated to State education board, Central Board of Secondary Education (CBSE), Indian School Certificate Examination Board (ICSE), International Baccalaureate (IB) and International General Certificate of Secondary Education (IGCSE).  Most of the ICSE/ISC schools in Kerala are found in Trivandrum, which makes Trivandrum city an educational hub in Kerala.

A 

 Arya Central School, Pattom TVM

B

C 

 Chinmaya Vidyalaya, Manacaud
 Chinmaya Vidyalaya, Kunnumpuram
 Chinmaya Vidyalaya, Vazhuthacaud
 Christ Nagar School, Thiruvananthapuram, Kowdiar

G 

 Government Higher Secondary School for Girls Cottonhill, Vazhutacaud
 Government Model Boys Higher Secondary School, Thycaud
 Government Model Higher Secondary School, Varkala
 G.Karthikeyan Smaraka Government Model V HSS, Vellanad

H 
 Holy Angels' I.S.C School, Thiruvananthapuram

J 
 Jyoti Nilayam High School

K 

 Kendriya Vidyalaya, Akkulam
 Kendriya Vidyalaya, Pallippuram, Thiruvananthapuram
 Kendriya Vidyalaya, Pangode
 Kendriya Vidyalaya, Pattom
 Kendriya Vidyalaya, SAP, Peroorkada

L 

 Loyola College of Social Sciences, Thiruvananthapuram
 Loyola School, Thiruvananthapuram

M 

 Mannam Memorial Residential Higher Secondary School (M M R H S S), Neeramankara
 MGM Model School Ayiroor, Varkala

N 
 Nirmala Bhavan Higher Secondary School, Kowdiar

S 

 Saraswathi Vidyalaya, Trivandrum, Vattiyoorkavu
 SMV High School, Thiruvananthapuram

T

 The Oxford School, Kallattumukku
 Trivandrum International School, Kizhuvalam
 The Charter School, Goureesapattom

V 

VSSC Central School, Kazhakuttom

X
 St. Xavier's College, Thumba, Thiruvananthapuram

See also 
 List of colleges in Thiruvananthapuram

 
Thiruvananthapuram
Thiruvananthapuram schools
Schools